Orlando Cossani (2 August 1932 – 18 March 2004) was an Argentine swimmer. He competed in the men's 200 metre breaststroke at the 1952 Summer Olympics.

References

1932 births
2004 deaths
Argentine male swimmers
Olympic swimmers of Argentina
Swimmers at the 1952 Summer Olympics
Place of birth missing
Swimmers at the 1951 Pan American Games
Swimmers at the 1955 Pan American Games
Pan American Games medalists in swimming
Pan American Games silver medalists for Argentina
Male breaststroke swimmers
Medalists at the 1951 Pan American Games
Medalists at the 1955 Pan American Games
20th-century Argentine people